Khanom mo kaeng is a traditional Thai dessert. It is similar to an egg custard or a kind of flan. Khanom mo kaeng is made with coconut milk, eggs (either chicken or duck), palm sugar, white sugar, salt, shallots and a bit of oil.
There are different variations of khanom mo kaeng. The kind of starch that is used is usually taros, but sometimes are used hulled mung beans, lotus seeds, sweet potatoes, or other starches.

History
Maria Guyomar de Pinha is the queen of Thai desserts during the Ayutthaya period. She created many desserts, some of which were influenced by Portuguese cuisine, such as curry puffs, khanom mo kaeng, thong muan, thong yot, thong yip, foi thong, and khanom phing. These desserts were presented to King Narai and Princess Sudawadi, who was the daughter of King Narai. Khanom mo kaeng was served to King Narai in a pot which was made from brass.

See also
 List of Thai desserts

References

Thai desserts and snacks
Portuguese fusion cuisine